Mistral Raymond (born September 7, 1987) is a former American football safety. He was selected by the Minnesota Vikings in the 6th round (170th overall pick) of the 2011 NFL Draft.

College career
Raymond began his collegiate career at Ellsworth Community College in Iowa Falls, Iowa.
In the 2010 season, he was selected to the All-BIG East second-team while at USF.

Professional career
He was drafted by the Minnesota Vikings with the 170th overall pick in the sixth round of the 2011 NFL Draft.

References

External links
South Florida Bulls bio

1987 births
Living people
American football safeties
South Florida Bulls football players
Minnesota Vikings players
Players of American football from Florida
People from Palmetto, Florida